Boyle is a lunar impact crater that is located in the southern hemisphere on the rugged far side of the Moon. It is adjacent to the larger crater Hess to the southeast, and lies about midway between the craters Alder to the north-northeast and Abbe to the south-southwest.

The outer rim of Boyle is nearly circular, and displays some slumping around the interior. Most of the rim is sharp-edged and displays little appearance of wear due to subsequent impacts. The southern rim, however, is overlain by a wide, irregular groove in the surface that follows a course from east to west along the rim. There is also an overlapping formation of tiny craterlets overlapping the narrow strip of terrain that joins Boyle to Hess.

The interior of the crater is relatively flat, with a long, low central ridge at the midpoint. This rise is aligned in a linear formation from southwest to northeast. There is a tiny craterlet near the eastern rim, but the interior is otherwise undistinguished.

Satellite craters 

By convention these features are identified on lunar maps by placing the letter on the side of the crater midpoint that is closest to Boyle.

References

External links
 

Impact craters on the Moon